Kabi Lungchok Assembly constituency is one of the 32 assembly constituencies of Sikkim, It lies on East Sikkim district and North Sikkim district. This constituency falls under Sikkim Lok Sabha constituency.

This constituency is reserved for members of the Bhutia-Lepcha community.

Members of Legislative Assembly
 2009: Thenlaytshering Bhutia, Sikkim Democratic Front
 2014: Ugen Nedup Bhutia, Sikkim Krantikari Morcha

Election results

2019

See also

 Sikkim Lok Sabha constituency
 Kabi Lungchok
 North Sikkim district

References

Assembly constituencies of Sikkim
Mangan district